The Başakşehir Fatih Terim Stadium is a football stadium in the Başakşehir district of Istanbul, Turkey. The stadium is named in honour of Turkish footballer and manager Fatih Terim.

Opened officially to public on 26 July 2014, the venue has a capacity of 17,156 spectators. It is the current home of İstanbul Başakşehir F.K. playing in the  Süper Lig.

The construction of the stadium was completed in about 16 months, and it cost ₺178 million.

Qarabağ FK played its 2020–21 UEFA Europa League group stage home matches at the stadium instead of their regular home stadium Tofiq Bahramov Republican Stadium in Baku due to the 2020 Nagorno-Karabakh conflict.

References

Sports venues in Istanbul
Sports venues completed in 2014
Süper Lig venues
2014 establishments in Turkey
İstanbul Başakşehir F.K.